Littig  is a small unincorporated community in eastern Travis County, Texas, United States established in 1883. Littig is on the Southern Pacific line two miles (3 km) south of U.S. Highway 290 and eighteen miles (29 km) northeast of the state capital, Austin, in eastern Travis County. It began with one of the oldest black communities in the state, and now has a diverse population. The Littig Cemetery is located nearby.

Geography
The community is in easternmost Travis County.

Littig is surrounded by blackland prairie soil, appropriate for growing cotton, maize and corn. An important creek, part of the watershed, meanders along the Southern Pacific right-of-way with numerous wooden trestles near Littig.

History
The townsite was laid out in 1883 on land donated by Jackson Morrow, a former slave. The original plat placed the train depot in the center of a one square mile area. The town was named for A. B. Littig, former general division agent of the Houston and Texas Central Railway, who surveyed the townsite, following the practice of naming new railroad towns after officers of the company. It had a railroad depot and locomotive water tank. A church and school were built in 1887 on land donated by J. W. Bitting. In 1889 a post office was established there with Thomas B. Fowler as postmaster. (The Houston and Texas Central Railway was succeeded by the Southern Pacific Transportation Company).

By 1900 Littig had a general store, two cotton gins, three churches, and 168 residents. In 1907 the Littig common school district had three one-teacher schools for 185 black students and a one-teacher school for 33 white students. The population of Littig and many other small Texas communities such as nearby Kimbro, Manda and Lund began to decline during the 1930s due to advances in automobile transportation and mechanized agriculture; its population fell from an estimated 150 in 1936 to 35 by the 1940s. The Littig schools were consolidated with the Manda Common School District in 1952. The post office at Littig was discontinued in 1954, and mail for the community was sent via Elgin in Bastrop County. A church and several houses marked the community's location on topographic maps of the area in the 1980s. The population of Littig was reported as 37 from the late 1960s through 2000.

References

External links

Unincorporated communities in Texas
Unincorporated communities in Travis County, Texas